Rodrigo Caio Coquette Russo (born 17 August 1993), known as Rodrigo Caio, is a footballer who plays as a central defender for Flamengo and the Brazil national team.

Club career

São Paulo

Born in Dracena, São Paulo, Rodrigo Caio is a product of São Paulo FC's academy and started his career as a defensive midfielder. In 2012, in a 3–2 win against Santos FC in the State League, he played as right back, with the responsibility of marking Neymar. After the game, Caio was praised by press for his success in holding down the santista forward. He executed the movimento do escorpião (In English, Scorpion Movement), a well known move in indoor soccer, to prevent some dribbles and shots from Neymar.

In 2013, with Paulo Miranda and Edson Silva injured, Caio started playing as a centre back. After good performances, he was praised by coach Paulo Autuori who highlighted his contribution to São Paulo's defense. Caio continued to perform so well that Antônio Carlos, hired by the club in the middle of the Brazilian League season, was mostly confined to the substitute's bench.

On 2 August 2014, Caio damaged his anterior cruciate ligament, going on to miss a further several months. He returned to the field on 16 March 2015.

On 12 June 2015, it was reported that Caio signed a five-year contract with La Liga side Valencia CF, for a €12.5 million fee plus four million more in add-ons. On 29 June 2015, the transfer to Valencia collapsed after the player failed two medicals.

Flamengo
On 29 December 2018, Caio joined Flamengo on a contract running until 2023. Flamengo agreed to pay €5 million for 45% of his economic rights from São Paulo, the transfer includes an achievement clause in the next two years that allows the purchase of 30% of his rights for another €2 million.

Career statistics

Club

International

Honours

Club
São Paulo
Copa Sudamericana: 2012

Flamengo
Copa Libertadores: 2019, 2022
Recopa Sudamericana: 2020
Campeonato Brasileiro Série A: 2019, 2020
Copa do Brasil: 2022
Supercopa do Brasil: 2020, 2021
Campeonato Carioca: 2019, 2020, 2021

International
Brazil
Olympic Gold Medal: 2016
Brazil U20
Toulon Tournament: 2014

Individual
Toulon Tournament Golden Ball: 2014
South American Team of the Year: 2019
Campeonato Brasileiro Série A Team of the Year: 2019
Campeonato Carioca Team of the Year: 2019, 2020

References

External links

Rodrigo Caio featured in Brazil: the talent factory 2013

1993 births
Living people
People from Dracena
Brazilian footballers
Association football midfielders
Association football defenders
Brazil youth international footballers
Brazil under-20 international footballers
Brazil international footballers
Campeonato Brasileiro Série A players
São Paulo FC players
CR Flamengo footballers
Copa América Centenario players
Copa Libertadores-winning players
Olympic footballers of Brazil
Footballers at the 2016 Summer Olympics
Olympic gold medalists for Brazil
Olympic medalists in football
Medalists at the 2016 Summer Olympics
Footballers from São Paulo (state)